The Danish Maritime Accident Investigation Board (DMAIB) is the maritime accident investigation agency of Denmark, headquartered in Valby, Copenhagen. It is an agency of the Ministry of Business and Growth Denmark.

History
Previously the Danish Maritime Authority's Division for Investigation of Maritime Accidents investigated maritime accidents. A European Union directive asks countries to establish maritime investigation authorities that are independent of the maritime administration divisions. The bill L xx will cause Denmark to establish a new maritime investigation agency.

References

Further reading
 "Den Maritime Havarikommission har afløst Opklaringsenheden." (Archive) SØFARTEN OG DANMARK. 4. November 2011. nr. 44. p. 8

External links
 Danish Maritime Accident Investigation Board
Act no. 457 of 18 May 2011 on safety investigations of marine accidents. (Archive) - English translation of Danish document
 Act no. 457 of 18 May 2011 on safety investigations of marine accidents. (Archive) - The original Danish version has legal authority

Water transport in Denmark
Government agencies of Denmark